Ledger is an English surname. Notable people with the surname include:

 Barry Ledger (born 1962), English rugby league footballer
 Bob Ledger (1937–2015), English football player
 Charles Ledger (1818–1906), English quinine expert
 Heath Ledger (1979–2008), Australian actor
 Jen Ledger (born 1989), English drummer
 Peter Ledger (1945–1994), Australian artist and illustrator
 Philip Ledger (1937–2012), British classical musician and academic
 Robert Ledger (born 1890s), English footballer
 Ron Ledger (1920–2004), British politician
Sarah Ledger (born 1989), British ice hockey player
 Sep Ledger (died 1917), South African rugby union player
 Tom Ledger (born 1992), Australian rules footballer

Surnames
Surnames of English origin
English-language surnames
Surnames of British Isles origin